Haplochromis mento is a species of cichlid endemic to Lake Victoria.  This species can reach a length of  SL.

References

mento
Fish of Tanzania
Fish of Lake Victoria
Endemic fauna of Tanzania
Fish described in 1922
Taxonomy articles created by Polbot